Sangeetha Mohan is an Indian film and TV actress active in the Malayalam language. She is well known for performing many television soap characters and later turned out to be one of the most sorted script writer in Malayalam television.

Biography 
Sangeetha Mohan was born in Trivandrum, Kerala. She was born as the youngest daughter to Mr. Gopi Mohan and Mrs. Jayakumari. Her father was a senior accountant in KSRTC, and her mother was an Additional Secretary in Kerala Public Service Commission. She has an elder sister, Saritha Mohan, who is an Officer in Agriculture Department.

Acting career 
She and her sister Saritha Mohan appeared in an advertisement of Kilimark Umbrella. She made her full-time acting debut in a Malayalam television serial Saumini which was aired on Doordarshan. She too worked as a television host (anchor) in several celebrity events and TV shows. Sangeetha also served as a story writer in a Malayalam serial Vasthavam. Sangeetha has acted in some popular Malayalam television serials such as Saumini, Jwalayayi and Dhathuputhri. She last acted in a Malayalam film titled Kaviyude Osyath which was released in 2017.

Television credits
Serials (Partial)

Filmography

TV Shows

Soundarya'Prada'
Old Gems
 Ladies Only
 Veettamma
 Navarasam
 Tharotsavam
 Nakshathradeepangal
 Onnum Onnum Moonnu
 Koottukkari
 Oh My God
 Dream Drive
 Coat Eeswaran
 Comedy Festival
 Sindooram
 Gulumal
 Sarigama
 Vellotturuli
 Don't Do
 Uthrada Rathri
 Malayali Durbar
 Sreekandan Nair Show
 Humorous Talk Show
 Nammal Thammil
 Comedy Stars
 Smart Show
 Atham Pathu Ruchi
 Flowers Oru Kodi

Albums
 Radhamadhavam
 Namo Namah Sree

See also 
Malayalam cinema
List of Indian film actresses

References

External links 
 

Living people
Actresses from Chennai
Actresses in Malayalam cinema
Indian film actresses
21st-century Indian actresses
Indian television actresses
Actresses in Malayalam television
Year of birth missing (living people)
Indian voice actresses